The commune of Buhiga is a commune of Karuzi Province in central Burundi. The capital lies at Buhiga.

References

Communes of Burundi
Karuzi Province